Ananiv Raion was a raion (district) in Odesa Oblast of Ukraine. Its administrative center was the city of Ananiv. The raion was abolished on 18 July 2020 as part of the administrative reform of Ukraine, which reduced the number of raions of Odesa Oblast to seven. Its territory became part of Podilsk Raion. The last estimate of the raion population was 

At the time of disestablishment, the raion consisted of two hromadas:
 Ananiv urban hromada with the administration in Ananiv;
 Dolynske rural hromada with the administration in the selo of Dolynske.

References

Former raions of Odesa Oblast
1961 establishments in the Soviet Union
Ukrainian raions abolished during the 2020 administrative reform